The 2014 New Mexico Lobos football team represented the University of New Mexico in the 2014 NCAA Division I FBS football season. The Lobos were led by third-year head coach Bob Davie. They played their home games at University Stadium and were members of the Mountain Division of the Mountain West Conference. They finished the season 4–8, 2–6 in Mountain West play to finish in a tie for fifth place in the Mountain Division.

Schedule

Schedule Source:

Game summaries

UTEP

Arizona State

at New Mexico State

Fresno State

at UTSA

San Diego State

at Air Force

at UNLV

Boise State

at Utah State

at Colorado State

Wyoming

References

New Mexico
New Mexico Lobos football seasons
New Mexico Lobos football